The following are international rankings for Iran:

Agriculture

Communication and information technology

Demographics

Economy

Education

Energy

Environment and ecology

General

Globalization

Health

History and culture

Industry and mining

Military and defense

Politics

Religion

Science and technology

Society

Transport

Notes
§.The surveys producing these world rankings have been done in different times and might not be current. Please refer to the specific articles or sources for updated information, where available. Furthermore, in most surveys only the important countries in the respective fields have been surveyed, thus the ranks might not be out of the whole world and all the countries. It should also be noted that the rankings are based on surveys by numerous entities with different benchmarks and standards, thus caution is needed in their interpretation of final results specially in the case of subjective field matters, as some of these rankings maybe based on speculative, biased, subjective or politicized evaluations. Finally, it is always important to consider trend when making comparisons, since single point data may be exceptional in nature (e.g. Iran's 2008 drought and wheat production).

See also

Lists by country
Lists of countries and territories

References

External links
NationMaster.com - International rankings of Iran (including time series)
 Nourlaw.com - Legal Guide to Iranian Market - 2017

Iran
International rankings